Nicholas Cleobury (born 23 June 1950) is an English conductor.

Cleobury was organ scholar at Worcester College, Oxford, conductor of Schola Cantorum of Oxford and held assistant organist posts at Chichester Cathedral and Christ Church, Oxford before turning to orchestral and operatic work. He is founder-laureate of the Britten Sinfonia and has been particularly active in the promotion of contemporary music.   He was from 1997 to 2015 principal conductor of the Oxford Bach Choir.

Cleobury's elder brother Stephen was director of music at King's College, Cambridge.

Cleobury joined the Queensland Conservatorium as head of opera in 2016.

References

External links
Nicholas Cleobury web site (accessed May 2006)
Interview by Bruce Duffie, 2001

1950 births
Living people
English conductors (music)
British male conductors (music)
People from Bromley
People educated at King's School, Worcester
Alumni of Worcester College, Oxford
Cathedral organists
English classical organists
British male organists
Assistant Organists of Chichester Cathedral
Honorary Members of the Royal Academy of Music
21st-century British conductors (music)
21st-century organists
21st-century British male musicians
Male classical organists